Savona is an unincorporated community in Darke County, in the U.S. state of Ohio.

History
Savona was originally called Tecumseh. A post office called Tecumseh was established in 1885, the name was changed to Savona in 1897, and the post office closed in 1933.

References

Unincorporated communities in Darke County, Ohio
Unincorporated communities in Ohio